is the founder, guitarist, and lead singer of the Japanese new wave rock group, Polysics. He occasionally works as a remix artist under the alias POLY-1. He is known for having very energetic live performances.

References 

Living people
1978 births
Sony Music Entertainment Japan artists
Singers from Tokyo
Japanese guitarists
21st-century Japanese singers
21st-century guitarists
21st-century Japanese male singers